Hugo Manuel Jazmín (born 7 September 1979) was an Argentine footballer. 

In 2010, he played for then Chilean second-tier side Lota Schwager.

References
 Profile at BDFA 
 

1979 births
Living people
Argentine footballers
Argentine expatriate footballers
Club Atlético Huracán footballers
Lota Schwager footballers
Expatriate footballers in Chile
Expatriate footballers in Paraguay
Association football defenders
People from Formosa, Argentina